WHVY is a Christian radio station licensed to Coshocton, Ohio, broadcasting on 89.5 MHz FM.  WHVY is owned by Clyde Educational Broadcasting Foundation.

References

External links
WHVY's website

HVY